In View may refer to:

 In View: The Best of R.E.M. 1988–2003, a DVD featuring videos by R.E.M.
 In View (TV series), a Canadian cultural current affairs television series 
 "In View" (song), a 2006 song by The Tragically Hip